Geir Arne Skogstad (born ) is a Norwegian wheelchair curler and ice sledge hockey (para ice hockey) player.

Career
As a member of the Norwegian ice sledge hockey team he participated at the 2002 Paralympic Games where the Norwegian team won a silver medal.

As a wheelchair curler, he participated at the 2006 and 2010 Winter Paralympics.

Teams

Wheelchair

Men's

References

External links 

Profile at the Official Website for the 2010 Winter Paralympics in Vancouver
 

Living people
1973 births
Norwegian male curlers
Norwegian wheelchair curlers
Paralympic wheelchair curlers of Norway
Wheelchair curlers at the 2006 Winter Paralympics
Wheelchair curlers at the 2010 Winter Paralympics
Wheelchair curlers at the 2022 Winter Paralympics
World wheelchair curling champions
Norwegian sledge hockey players
Paralympic sledge hockey players of Norway
Paralympic silver medalists for Norway
Ice sledge hockey players at the 2002 Winter Paralympics
Medalists at the 2002 Winter Paralympics
Paralympic medalists in sledge hockey
21st-century Norwegian people